Luo Tong (193–228), courtesy name Gongxu, was an official serving under the warlord Sun Quan during the late Eastern Han dynasty and early Three Kingdoms period of China.

Life
Luo Tong was from Wushang County (烏傷縣), Kuaiji Commandery, which is around present-day Yiwu, Zhejiang. His father Luo Jun (駱俊), who served the Prince of Chen Liu Chong as his chancellor (陳相) in the Eastern Han dynasty, was killed by the warlord Yuan Shu. Luo Tong's mother remarried after her husband's death, and became a concubine of the official Hua Xin. Luo Tong, who was seven years old then, returned to Kuaiji Commandery with his close friends. Before he left, his mother tearfully saw him off, but Luo Tong did not look back when he boarded the carriage. When the carriage driver told him his mother was behind him, Luo Tong said, "I don't want to make my mother miss me even more. That's why I don't look back." Luo Tong was also known for being filial to his stepmother (Hua Xin's official spouse).

At the time, there was a famine, so the residents in Luo Tong's hometown and other travellers taking shelter there suffered from hunger. Luo Tong was very worried about this and his appetite decreased. His elder sister, who was widowed and had no children, was known for being very kind. She saw that her brother looked very upset, so she asked him why. Luo Tong said, "I feel bad when I can fill my own stomach while those people don't have enough to eat." His sister replied, "You're right. Why do you suffer in silence and not tell me about this?" She then took grain from her personal stores and gave it to Luo Tong, and also informed their mother about it. Luo Tong's mother agreed with what they were doing, and she distributed grain to the people. Luo Tong became famous after this incident.

When the warlord Sun Quan was nominally serving as the Administrator (太守) of Kuaiji Commandery, Luo Tong, then 19 years old, was appointed as the Chancellor of Wucheng County (烏程縣; south of present-day Huzhou, Zhejiang), which had over 10,000 residents. He performed well in office and received praise from Sun Quan, who promoted him to an Officer of Merit (功曹) and acting Cavalry Commandant (騎都尉). He married the daughter of Sun Quan's cousin, Sun Fu. Luo Tong was known for being very diligent in examining the state of affairs in his jurisdiction. Whenever he encountered important issues that required action, he would attempt to resolve them within the day itself. He also advised Sun Quan to give greater attention to talented and virtuous people, so as to attract them to serve him. He suggested that Sun Quan meet the guests individually (instead of in groups) and hold private conversations with them to understand them better and make them feel appreciated and grateful to him. Sun Quan accepted Luo Tong's advice. Luo Tong was appointed as "General of the Household Who Builds Loyalty" (建忠中郎將) and was placed in charge of 3,000 troops. He was placed in command of Ling Tong's unit after Ling died.

Some time later, Luo Tong noticed that the people were suffering not only because of heavy taxes and being recruited to perform hard labour, but also because of contagious diseases spreading around. He wrote a long memorial to Sun Quan, explaining the difficult situation the people are in, and pointing out that if the problems could affect the stability of Eastern Wu in the long term if they were not resolved. He urged Sun Quan to implement policies to help the people and relieve their burdens. Sun Quan felt touched after reading Luo Tong's memorial and he paid greater attention to Luo's ideas. Throughout his career, Luo Tong had written many memorials to Sun Quan, giving appropriate advice on policies. Among all the pieces of advice he gave to Sun Quan, the most notable one is his suggestion to stop increasing conscription, because he felt that forcing the people into conscription would lead to social problems and make them feel resentful. Sun Quan argued with him again and again over this issue, but eventually accepted his ideas.

In 221–222, Luo Tong participated in the Battle of Xiaoting between Eastern Wu and its former ally state, Shu Han. He was a subordinate of the Wu general Lu Xun, and the Wu forces emerged victorious in the battle. Luo Tong was promoted to Lieutenant-General (偏將軍) for his contributions. Later, in 222–223, he participated in the Battle of Ruxu against Wu's rival state Cao Wei. The Wei general Cao Ren had sent his subordinate Chang Diao (常雕) to attack Zhongzhou (中洲). Luo Tong and Yan Gui (嚴圭) led the Wu forces to Zhongzhou to resist the enemy and defeated them. For his success, Luo Tong was promoted to Area Commander of Ruxu (濡須督) and enfeoffed as the Marquis of Xinyang Village (新陽亭侯). He also spoke up for Zhang Wen when Zhang Wen was implicated in a scandal involving Ji Yan, but Sun Quan did not accept his advice.

Luo Tong died in 228 at the age of 36 (by East Asian age reckoning).

Luo Jun
Luo Tong's father was Luo Jun (駱俊), whose courtesy name was Xiaoyuan (孝遠). Luo Jun was known for being skilful in handling both civil and military affairs. He served as a minor officer in his home commandery when he was young and was nominated as a xiaolian (civil service candidate). He was subsequently promoted to a Gentleman of Writing (尚書郎), and was later appointed as the Chancellor of Chen State. When chaos broke out towards the end of the Eastern Han dynasty, Luo Jun successfully maintained law and order within Chen State and ensured that the people lived well and were safe. Sometime in the 190s, when the warlord Yuan Shu was running short of supplies, he sent a messenger to Chen State to request for grain. Luo Jun saw Yuan Shu as a traitor and despised him, so he refused to send supplies. The angry Yuan Shu then sent assassins to kill Luo Jun.

Appraisal
Chen Shou, who wrote Luo Tong's biography in the Records of the Three Kingdoms, appraised Luo Tong as follows: "Luo Tong understood righteousness and provided rational advice. He was able to convince those in power."

See also
 Lists of people of the Three Kingdoms

Notes

References

 Chen, Shou (3rd century). Records of the Three Kingdoms (Sanguozhi).
 Pei, Songzhi (5th century). Annotations to Records of the Three Kingdoms (Sanguozhi zhu).

193 births
228 deaths
Generals under Sun Quan
People from Jinhua
Eastern Wu generals
Han dynasty generals from Zhejiang